American rapper Busta Rhymes has released ten studio albums, three compilation albums, eight mixtapes, ninety-one singles (including fifty as a featured artist), fourteen promotional singles and fifty-six music videos. Busta Rhymes signed his first recording contract with Elektra Records at the age of just 17, as a member of hip-hop group Leaders of the New School. Though the group would disband in 1994, a number of well-received guest appearances on songs by artists including A Tribe Called Quest and Mary J. Blige led Elektra to offer Busta Rhymes a solo contract in 1995. His debut studio album, The Coming, was released the following year, with lead single "Woo Hah!! Got You All in Check" reaching number eight on the United States Billboard Hot 100 and being certified gold by the Recording Industry Association of America (RIAA). As of 2019 Busta Rhymes has sold around 9,000,000 albums.

Studio albums

Collaborative albums

Compilation albums

Mixtapes

EPs

Singles

As lead artist

As featured artist

Promotional singles

Other charted songs

Discography with Flipmode Squad

Albums:

The Imperial (1998, Elektra)

Mixtapes:

The Facelift (2007)

Singles:

"Cha Cha Cha" (1998)
"Everybody On The Line Outside" / "Run For Cover" (1998)
"Here We Go" (2002)
"Just Chill" (2002)
"Ain't Nothin' To Fuck With" (2003)

Guest appearances

Music videos

As lead artist

As featured artist

See also 
 Flipmode Squad discography
 Leaders of the New School discography

Notes

References

External links
 
 
 

Hip hop discographies
Discographies of American artists